This is a list of episodes for Season 10 of Late Night with Conan O'Brien, which aired from September 3, 2002 to August 14, 2003.

Series overview

Season 10

References

Episodes (season 10)